The 2000 Florida State Seminoles baseball team represented Florida State University in the 2000 NCAA Division I baseball season. The Seminoles played their home games at Dick Howser Stadium, and played as part of the Atlantic Coast Conference. The team was coached by Mike Martin in his twenty-first season as head coach at Florida State.

The Seminoles reached the College World Series, their seventeenth appearance in Omaha, where they finished in third place after splitting two games against Southern California, a win against Texas and a semifinal loss to eventual champion LSU.

Personnel

Roster

Coaches

Schedule and results

References

Florida State Seminoles baseball seasons
Florida State Seminoles
College World Series seasons
Florida State Seminoles baseball
Florida State